Louise Reny is a Canadian vocalist and songwriter.  She was in the bands One to One, Sal's Birdland, and Artificial Joy Club.  She worked with Alanis Morissette on her first albums.

Work with Alanis Morissette
Reny along with her One to One bandmate and husband at the time Leslie Howe worked on Alanis Morissette's first two albums.  Reny and Howe co-wrote Morissette's albums Alanis and Now Is the Time, with Howe producing and releasing on his own Ghetto Records label.

Reny met Morissette when Morissette was 12 years old.  Both from Ottawa, Reny was well known in the local music scene.  Morissette sought her out for advice.

Notes and references

External links
 Bubbles Cash and the Rhythm Method web site
 Artificial Joy Club web site

Living people
Canadian women rock singers
Canadian women singer-songwriters
Canadian women pop singers
20th-century Canadian women singers
Year of birth missing (living people)